DIY Week is a British fortnightly business-to-business magazine for those in the do it yourself (DIY), household hardware and homeware market. The magazine is published by Datateam in Maidstone, Kent, in England.

Founded in 1874, DIY Week is sold to retailers of hardware, housewares, garden and DIY products, and their suppliers, and contains  news, comment, financial analysis and market trend information.

History
Originally launched by a Birmingham hardware wholesaler as Martineau & Smith's Monthly Circular, the magazine was very soon renamed Hardware Trade Journal, and changed from monthly to weekly publication in 1900. Over the following decades it became the major business magazine for its market, absorbing its main competitor, The Ironmonger, as well as many small titles. It was renamed DIY Week in 1988, reflecting the rise of the DIY market, and switched to fortnightly frequency in 1991.

Datateam acquired the magazine in 2013.

References

External links
 DIY Week’s official site

1874 establishments in the United Kingdom
Business magazines published in the United Kingdom
Weekly magazines published in the United Kingdom
Biweekly magazines published in the United Kingdom
Magazines established in 1874
Mass media in Kent
Mass media in Birmingham, West Midlands
Monthly magazines published in the United Kingdom